Find Your Harmony is the first studio album by Moldovan trance producer and DJ Andrew Rayel. It was released on May 30, 2014.

Track listing

References

2014 debut albums
Andrew Rayel albums
Armada Music albums